Zohreh Barzegar (born 21 August 1996 in Qaem Shahr) is an Iranian karateka. She achieved gold medal in final game of Asian karate championships 2019 held in Tashkent, Uzbekistan in kumite +61 category.

In 15th Asian Karate Federation (AKF) Cadet, Junior & U21 Championships  barzegar, who was competing at the –55 kg weight category in Under-21 age group, managed to thrash rivals from Jordan, Japan, Thailand and China Taipei before standing on top of the podium.

References

External links 
 
 
 WKF CURRENT RANKING - CATEGORIES - Female Kumite 68+ kg

1996 births
Living people
Iranian female karateka
People from Qaem Shahr
21st-century Iranian women